
Gmina Skórcz is a rural gmina (administrative district) in Starogard County, Pomeranian Voivodeship, in northern Poland. Its seat is the town of Skórcz, although the town is not part of the territory of the gmina.

Villages
Gmina Skórcz contains the villages and settlements of Barłożno, Bojanowo, Boraszewo, Bukowiec Nowy, Czarne, Czarnylas, Drewniaczki, Kranek Drugi, Mieliczki, Mirotki, Miryce, Nowy Bukowiec, Pączewo, Pólko, Pustkowie, Ryzowie, Skórcz-Kranek, Wielbrandowo, Wielki Bukowiec, Wolental, Wybudowanie Wielbrandowskie and Zajączek.

Neighbouring gminas
Gmina Skórcz is bordered by the town of Skórcz and by the gminas of Bobowo, Lubichowo, Morzeszczyn, Osiek and Smętowo Graniczne.

References
Polish official population figures 2006

Skorcz
Starogard County